Paul Quinn (born 19 December 1961) is a Scottish footballer who played for Stenhousemuir, Queen of the South, Cowdenbeath, Stranraer, Clyde and Dumbarton.

References

External links

1961 births
Scottish footballers
Stenhousemuir F.C. players
Queen of the South F.C. players
Cowdenbeath F.C. players
Stranraer F.C. players
Clyde F.C. players
Dumbarton F.C. players
Scottish Football League players
Living people
Association football midfielders
Kirkintilloch Rob Roy F.C. players
Annbank United F.C. players